Bert Theunissen (born 31 August 1939) is a Dutch retired football midfielder and later manager.

References

1939 births
Living people
Dutch footballers
Association football midfielders
SBV Vitesse players
FC Utrecht players
Heracles Almelo players
PSV Eindhoven players
BSC Young Boys players
Fortuna Sittard players
SC Telstar players
Eredivisie players
Dutch expatriate footballers
Expatriate footballers in Switzerland
Dutch expatriate sportspeople in Switzerland
Dutch football managers
FC Bern managers
FC Winterthur managers
BSC Young Boys managers
Apollon Smyrnis F.C. managers
FC Martigny-Sports managers
FC Baden managers
Dutch expatriate football managers
Expatriate football managers in Switzerland
Expatriate football managers in Greece
Dutch expatriate sportspeople in Greece